Abner Hugh Cook (March 15, 1814 – February 22, 1884) was a self-taught Texas architect and general contractor responsible for the design of several historic and notable buildings in Texas, particularly Austin, such as the Texas Governor's Mansion. He also designed the west wing of the original main building of the University of Texas at Austin (since demolished) and the first state penitentiary in Huntsville.

Biography

Cook was born near Salisbury, North Carolina, the son of William and Susanna (née Hill) Cook. He may have done a construction apprenticeship in Salisbury. At age 21, Cook moved to Macon, Georgia and found work in construction. When the Panic of 1837 brought building to a halt, Cook moved to Nashville, Tennessee, but there was little work to be found in Nashville, and he moved to Texas in 1839.

Cook settled in Austin and supported himself with private commissions for houses and furniture. Cook helped form the first Presbyterian church in Austin and built the congregation's first log church with his own hands. On September 15, 1842, he married Eliza T. Logan, with whom he had four sons. During this time there was little building construction in Austin so he partnered in 1840 with Jacob Higgins in ownership of The Higgins Mill in Bastrop.

Notable works

In 1847, Cook built a large residence for a wealthy Austin patron. Between summer 1848 until early 1850 he was at Huntsville, supervising the construction of the Texas State Penitentiary and served as its first superintendent. Cook then designed and built three large Greek Revival homes in Austin which still stand: Woodlawn (1853), the Texas Governor's Mansion (1855), and the Neill-Cochran House (1855).

Later life

As more trained architects moved to Austin after the Civil War, Cook concentrated on construction. He built residences, commercial buildings and the west wing of the main building of the newly founded University of Texas.

Death

He died on February 22, 1884, in Austin and was buried in Oakwood Cemetery.

Gallery

References

1884 deaths
1814 births
Architects from Texas
19th-century American architects